The Bust of Charles I was a sculptural bust produced by the Italian artist Gianlorenzo Bernini which according to one historian, "set the visual conventions for centuries … [establishing itself as] the official portrait of  secular absolutism.". The sculpture was of the then king Charles I of England, who wrote to Bernini that the artist's name was "exalted above those of all men of talent who have exercised your profession.".

Creation
Bernini did not travel to London to undertake the work; rather he made use of a painted triple portrait of Charles I (i.e. a view of Charles from three points) created especially by the Flemish artist Anthony van Dyck for Bernini. Despite not meeting Charles I face-to-face, Bernini's bust was considered a success at the time, and the English king rewarded Bernini with jewellery worth over 4,000 Roman scudi (a figure over 60 times the average yearly salary of a worker in Rome).

Pope Urban VIII sent the bust to Charles's queen Henrietta Maria in 1638 in the hope of encouraging a reconciliation of the Roman Catholic Church with the Church of England. The bust was presented in 1637 and admired for its workmanship and likeness to the king.  Charles rewarded Bernini with a valuable diamond ring.  Queen Henrietta Maria commissioned Bernini to make a companion bust of her, but the English Civil War intervened and it was never made.  The bust of Charles was sold at the end of the English Civil War but recovered for the Royal Collection on the Restoration, only to be destroyed by a fire in Whitehall Palace in January 1698.

Numerous copies of the image exist in other forms (e.g. engravings, bronze sculptures).

For a while in 19th and early 20th centuries, there was a belief in England and elsewhere that Bernini had also created a bust of Oliver Cromwell, the victor over Charles I in the English Civil War. However, the attribution was refuted in 1922.

See also
List of works by Gian Lorenzo Bernini

References

External links

1638 sculptures
Busts in the United Kingdom
Charles I of England in art
Busts by Gian Lorenzo Bernini
Henrietta Maria
Pope Urban VIII
England–Holy See relations